Max Schneider (born 28 July 2000) is a German professional footballer who plays as a midfielder for St. Louis City SC 2 in MLS Next Pro.

Early years 
Schneider was born in Cologne, Germany and played for the academy of Bayer Leverkusen before moving to the United States to play college soccer with the Marshall Thundering Herd. He never played for the Leverkusen first team, however, he was called up to the bench for a Europa League match.

College career 

Schneider played soccer for Marshall University from 2019 until 2022. He made a total of 52 appearances and scored 6 goals over three seasons for the team. He was a part of the team that won the 2020 NCAA College Cup and won numerous accolades throughout his career, including Conference USA Commissioner's Honor Roll, Conference USA All-Freshman Team, 2020 Second Team All-Conference USA, 2020 United Soccer Coaches All-Region Second Team, 2020 NCAA All-Tournament Team, and 2021 Second Team All-Conference USA.

Club career

St. Louis City 2 
On 7 February 2022, Schneider signed with St. Louis City SC 2 for the inaugural MLS Next Pro season. On 25 March, Schneider started in the inaugural game for St. Louis City SC 2 and MLS Next Pro in a 2–0 against Rochester New York FC. Schneider scored his first goal for the club in a 4–3 win against the Tacoma Defiance.

St. Louis City 
On 18 November 2022, St. Louis City SC announced that it has exercised a clause in Schneider's contract to promote him to the first team for the team's inaugural Major League Soccer season in 2023.

St. Louis City 2 
On 10 March 2023, Schneider signed for St. Louis City SC 2 on loan from St. Louis City SC.

Career statistics

Club

Honours 
Marshall Thundering Herd

 Conference USA regular season: 2020
 NCAA National Championship: 2020

References

External links 
 Max Schneider at Marshall Thundering Herd

2000 births
Living people
Association football midfielders
German expatriate sportspeople in the United States
Expatriate soccer players in the United States
Marshall Thundering Herd men's soccer players
MLS Next Pro players
Footballers from Cologne
German footballers
German expatriate footballers
St. Louis City SC 2 players